Our Lady's Hospital may refer to:

in Ireland
 Our Lady's Hospital, Cork, a psychiatric hospital in County Cork
 Our Lady's Hospital, Ennis, a psychiatric hospital in County Clare
 Our Lady's Hospital, Manorhamilton, a general hospital in County Leitrim
 Our Lady's Hospital, Navan, a general hospital in County Meath
 Our Lady's Children's Hospital, Crumlin, a paediatric hospital in Dublin